The Museum of the Kalavryta Holocaust is a museum in Kalavryta, Greece dedicated to the history of the Massacre of Kalavryta in 1943. The museum contains artifacts of the German occupation of the town and documents the massacre.

References

External links
Hellenic Ministry of Culture and Tourism
www.planetware.com

Museums in Western Greece
Kalavryta
World War II museums in Greece